The 1883–84 Iowa Hawkeyes men's soccer team represented the State University of Iowa during the 1883–84 college soccer season. Per the Intercollegiate Football Research Association and the American Soccer History Archives, the 1883–84 squad was declared the de facto national champion during this season, although it was nearly 20 years prior to the first formal awarding of a collegiate soccer champion. The team played two matches against Cornell College and won both 1–0, giving them a perfect 2–0–0 record, leaving them with the best overall record among college soccer programs that season.

According to a research study by Melvin Smith in his book Evolvements of Early American Foot Ball: Through the 1890/91 Season, it was Iowa's third season fielding a team.

Schedule 

|-
!colspan=6 style=""| Matches
|-

|-

|-
|}

References 

Iowa
1883
1883 in sports in Iowa
1884 in sports in Iowa
College soccer national championship-winning seasons (1866–1904)